Samik Roy Choudhury is an Indian Bengali filmmaker.

Introduction
Choudhury was born in the city of Calcutta into a Bengali middle-class family. Starting his career as a visual effects artist, he was drawn into independent filmmaking after making several short films. Among all his short Films Okiagari, Sex everywhere, Vanichi Vani and Yesterday was mostly celebrated. His debut feature film D Major (2016) was written, directed and produced by him. D Major was honored at FOG film festival '16, Kolkata International Film Festival 2016, Indian world Film Festival 2018.  He worked on Night at the Museum: Battle of the Smithsonian (2009), The Mummy: Tomb of the Dragon Emperor (2008) and Alvin and the Chipmunks: Chipwrecked (2011) and on many others as a visual effects technical director. Choudhury also directed the music video like Daniken, Mukhosh, Stobdho Jibon, Janla, Sanghoti Jaanai and a few more, in which Daniken, Janla and Saghoti Jaanai featured the singer Rupam Islam. His work as a dialogue writer, VFX supervisor, lyricist and associate director on the same 2010 Manoj Michigan movie 89 proves his versatile talent. His film Okiagari, which stars Mir Afsar Ali premieres at 26th KIFF on January 15, 2021.

Filmography
Okiagari (2021) 
Daniken  [MV] (2017)
D Major (2016)
Yesterday (2016) 
Vanichi Vani (2013) 
Loner Lost (in)Sanity [Short] (2011) 
Blood Honour Bleeds [Short] (2011) 
For a Change [Short] (2011)
The Mummy: Tomb of the Dragon Emperor [As Matchmove TD] (2008)
Night at the Museum: Battle of the Smithsonian [As Matchmove TD] (2009)
Cirque du Freak: The Vampire's Assistant [As Matchmove TD] (2009)
Alvin and the Chipmunks: The Squeakquel [As Matchmove TD] (2009)
Yogi Bear [As Matchmove TD] (2010)
Alvin and the Chipmunks: Chipwrecked [As Lighting TD] (2011)
89 (As Dialogue writer and VFX supervisor) (2015)

References

External links

Film directors from Kolkata
Visual effects artists
Living people
Year of birth missing (living people)